Amro Jenyat (born 15 January 1993) is a Syrian professional footballer who plays as a right-back or winger for Al-Karamah and the Syria national team.

Personal life
Jenyat is the younger brother of Syrian national team player Aatef.

Club career
Jenyat started his career with Al-Karamah. On 20 August 2014, he signed with Omani club Al-Shabab Club. He made his Oman Professional League debut on 11 September 2014 in a 2–2 draw against Bowsher Club.

In January 2020, Jenyat joined Qatari club Mesaimeer. He returned to Al-Karamah in September 2020. On 14 May 2021, Jenyat moved to Lebanese Premier League side Ahed on a free transfer, to play in the 2021 AFC Cup.

International career
Jenyat played for the Syria under-20 national team. He played for Syria at the 2019 AFC Asian Cup.

Career statistics

International
Scores and results list Syria's goal tally first, score column indicates score after each Jenyat goal.

References

External links
 
 
 

1993 births
Living people
Sportspeople from Homs
Syrian footballers
Association football fullbacks
Association football wingers
Al-Karamah players
Al-Muhafaza SC players
Al-Shabab SC (Seeb) players
Dhofar Club players
Al-Wahda SC (Syria) players
Mesaimeer SC players
Al Ahed FC players
Syrian Premier League players
Oman Professional League players
Qatari Second Division players
Syria international footballers
2019 AFC Asian Cup players
Syrian expatriate footballers
Expatriate footballers in Oman
Expatriate footballers in Qatar
Expatriate footballers in Lebanon
Syrian expatriate sportspeople in Oman
Syrian expatriate sportspeople in Qatar
Syrian expatriate sportspeople in Lebanon